Bashundhara City, often marketed as Bashundhara City Shopping Complex or Bashundhara City Shopping Mall, is a shopping mall in Dhaka. The mall is located in Panthapath, near Kawran Bazar, and was opened to the public on 6 August 2004. It is also one of the largest shopping malls in South Asia, with up to 50,000 visitors each day,

The mall has space for 2,325 retail stores and cafeterias.  It features a large underground gymnasium, a Star Cineplex cinema, a penthouse food court, an ice skating rink, a theme park, a fitness club, and a swimming pool.  It also includes the 19-story corporate offices of the Bashundhara Group.

It is designed by the principal architect Mustapha Khalid Palash and Mohammad Foyez Ullah of Vistaara.

Construction
Construction started in 1998 under Shafiat Sobhan, the vice-chairman of the Bashundhara Group. The cost of the building was more than USD100 million.

2009 fire

On 13 March 2009, the top floors of the Bashundhara City complex caught on fire. The blaze started around 1:30 pm, after Friday prayers, on one of the top floors. Most of the offices were empty, as Friday is the first day of the weekend in Bangladesh. A security guard died as he jumped off the top of the building to escape the fire and seventeen other people were injured. The chief security officer of the building was rescued from the rooftop by a Bangladesh Air Force Bell 212 helicopter.

Later that day, reports announced the deaths of three more people found in an elevator by a group of fire fighters and the number of injured people climbed to fifty.  Most of the injuries were caused by smoke inhalation. The fire took six hours to be brought under control due to the strong summer winds. The city's mayor, Sadeque Hossain Khoka, ordered all the fire services in the capital to the scene and requested assistance from army personnel.  The fire attracted thousands of onlookers outside the complex from Panthapath to Hatirpool, causing heavy traffic.

The fire was extinguished after nearly ten hours. Most of the victims who died were employees, and most of the shoppers were unharmed. The mall was closed for two days and was once again opened to the public on 16 March. According to the mall authorities, damages reached Tk2 billion (US$29m).  Minister of Home Affairs Tanjim Ahmad Sohel ordered a three-member committee to review the incident. He proclaimed the damage was caused due to the lack of fire-protection equipment during the time of the incident.

Gallery

See also

 List of shopping malls in Bangladesh
 Architecture of Bangladesh
 Jamuna Future Park

References

Further reading

External links

 Official webpage
 Bashundhara City Building and Construction Photos
 Google Satellite View

Shopping malls in Dhaka
Rotundas (architecture)
Shopping malls established in 2004